

The IFIL-Reghin RG-6 was a light aircraft built in Romania in 1957 for aeroclub use. It was designed by Vladimir Novichi at the request of the national sport flying association AVSAP, which specified the use of the Praga D engine, surplus stocks of which were available in Romania following production of the Zlín Z-22.

Novichi's design was for a conventional, low-wing cantilever monoplane with fixed, tailwheel undercarriage. The pilot and instructor sat in tandem under a long canopy. The structure was to be entirely of wood, so when production of the type was organised through Sovromtractor, it was assigned to the IFIL factory in Reghin, which was already producing wooden gliders. Only three examples of the RG-6 were built.

An RG-6 was used by pilot Vasile Petcu to set a national class airspeed record of 165 km/h (103 mph) over a 100 km closed circuit in 1957.

Specifications

Notes

References
 
 
 
 
 
 Уголок неба

1950s Romanian civil trainer aircraft
Reghin